Stephen Burtenshaw (23 November 1935 – 17 February 2022) was an English football player and manager. Burtenshaw played as a wing half for Brighton & Hove Albion. As a manager, he was at the helm of clubs Sheffield Wednesday, Everton, Queens Park Rangers and Arsenal.

Career
Burtenshaw started off his playing days in 1952 featuring as a wing half for Brighton & Hove Albion. At Albion, he won the Third Division (South) title in 1957–58. He lifted the Fourth Division title in 1964–65 with the Seagulls. Altogether he played 237 games in the Football League for Brighton & Hove.

After his playing days came to an end Burtenshaw became a coach at Brighton. Amongst the players he took under his wing was Howard Wilkinson, the future First Division winning manager of Leeds United.

Burtenshaw joined Arsenal as a coach in 1971, succeeding Don Howe after his departure to West Bromwich Albion. Burtenshaw stayed for two years before resigning, despite the club reaching an FA Cup final and coming second in the First Division.

Soon after, he moved to Sheffield Wednesday and spent two years there as manager. He later became a coach at Everton, managing the side in a caretaker capacity for three games in January 1977 after the club sacked Billy Bingham. He also went on to be at the helm of club Queens Park Rangers from 1978 to 1979.

Burtenshaw later returned to Arsenal as a coach and scout, and was caretaker manager of the club between March and May 1986, after the resignation of Don Howe as manager; Arsenal finished seventh in the First Division that season. He returned to his coaching role after the club appointed George Graham that summer. Burtenshaw's time at the club was overshadowed when he admitted taking "bungs" for signing John Jensen, in the scandal that led to Graham's sacking as Arsenal manager. He was fined £7,500 with £2,500 costs by the Football Association.

After leaving Arsenal along with Bruce Rioch in 1996, Burtenshaw became chief scout under Stewart Houston at Queens Park Rangers. Despite suffering a stroke in 2001 he later joined Kevin Keegan as scout at Manchester City, before retiring from football altogether.

Death
Burtenshaw died on 17 February 2022, at the age of 86.

Honours
Brighton and Hove Albion
Third Division (South): 1957–58
Fourth Division: 1964–65

References

External links
 

1935 births
2022 deaths
Footballers from Brighton
English footballers
Association football midfielders
Brighton & Hove Albion F.C. players
English Football League players
English football managers
Arsenal F.C. managers
Everton F.C. managers
Queens Park Rangers F.C. managers
Sheffield Wednesday F.C. managers
Arsenal F.C. non-playing staff
Queens Park Rangers F.C. non-playing staff
Manchester City F.C. non-playing staff